The ECWA Tag Team Championship is a professional wrestling tag team championship created and promoted by the American independent wrestling promotion, East Coast Wrestling Association (ECWA). There have been a total of 59 reigns and 4 vacancies shared between 44 different teams consisting of 83 distinctive champions. The current champions are The Marvelous Ones (Greg Spitz and Teddy Fine), who are in their first reign.

Title history

Combined reigns 

By team
{| class="wikitable sortable" style="text-align: center"
!Rank
!Team
!No. ofreigns
!Combineddays
|-
!1
| The Valedictorians || 2 || 973
|-
!2
| The Hollywood Hunks || 1 ||style="background-color:#bbeeff"| ¤764-778
|-
!3
| Lance Diamond and Cheetah Master || 1 || 581
|-
!4
| Logan Brothers  || 4 || 550
|-
!5
|style="background-color:#FFE6BD"| The Marvelous Ones  † || 1 || +
|-
!6
| The Funky White Boy and Marcus Waters || 1 || 420
|-
!7
| Low Ki and American Dragon || 1 || 364
|-
!8
| Fusion DS  || 3 || 336
|-
!9
| One Mean Team || 2 || 331
|-
!10
| The S.A.T. || 1 || 295
|-
!11
| Mr. Ooh La La and Jay D. Luscious || 2 || 292
|-
!12
| D-LINE || 2 || 287
|-
!13
| Pan's Corp Agency || 1 || 280
|-
!14
| The Extreme Rednecks || 3 || 265
|-
!15
| The Heavyweights || 1 || 259
|-
!16
| Team PCA || 1 || 231
|-
!17
| Boogie Woogie Brown and Inferno Brown || 2 ||style="background-color:#bbeeff"| ¤212-243
|-
!18
| Aden Chambers and Andrew Ryker || 1 || 203
|-
!19
| Midnight Sensations/The Sons Of Blackheart || 3 || 196
|-
!20
| Ace Darling and Matt Striker || 1 || 195
|-
!21
| Mega and Cha Cha Chance || 1 || 189
|-
!22
| Viper and Armageddon || 1 ||style="background-color:#bbeeff"| ¤178-208
|-
!23
| Dream Team  || 1 || 175
|-
!24
| The Best Around  || 1 || 167
|-
!25
| Leather 'n' Lace || 1 || 161
|-
!26
| Team CK || 1 || 154
|-
!27
| Ace Darling and Devon Storm || 1 || 140
|-
!rowspan=2|28
| Mark Schraeder and Thunder || 1 || 112
|-
| Team WCWA || 1 || 112
|-
!30
| Steve Corino and Lance Diamond || 2 || 106
|-
!31
| Mark Schraeder and Christian York || 1 || 104
|-
!32
| The Classics || 1 || 84
|-
!33
| The Maxx Brothers || 1 || 63
|-
!34
| Frankie Pickard and Tahir James || 1 || 56
|-
!35
| The Black Heart || 1 || 55
|-
!rowspan=2|36
| The Berlin Bad Boys || 1 || 49
|-
| The Sons Of Brooklyn || 1 || 49
|-
!rowspan=2|38
| Low Ki and Xavier || 1 || 28
|-
| The Arion Brothers || 1 || 28
|-
!40
| Ace Darling and Kid Flash || 1 ||style="background-color:#bbeeff"| ¤26-44
|-
!41
| Flatliners  || 1 || <1
|-
!rowspan=3|42
| The Backseat Boyz || 1 ||style="background-color:#bbeeff"| ¤N/A
|-
| The Haas Brothers || 1 ||style="background-color:#bbeeff"| ¤N/A
|-
| The Russian Invaders || 1 ||style="background-color:#bbeeff"| ¤N/A

By wrestler 
{|class="wikitable sortable" style="text-align: center"
!Rank
!Wrestler
!data-sort-type="number"|No. ofreigns
!data-sort-type="number"|Combineddays	
|-
!rowspan=2|1
| Billy Bax || 2 || 973
|-
| Rob Eckos || 2 || 973
|-
!rowspan=2|3
| Custom Made Man || 1 ||style="background-color:#bbeeff"| ¤764-778
|-
| Stunning Sean || 1 ||style="background-color:#bbeeff"| ¤764-778
|-
!5
| Lance Diamond || 2 || 687
|-
!6
| Cheetah Master || 1 || 581
|-
!rowspan=2|7
| Bryan Logan || 4 || 550
|-
| Matt Logan || 4 || 550
|-
!rowspan=2|9
| Damian Adams || 2 || 511
|-
| Ricky Martinez || 2 || 511
|-
!rowspan=2|11
| style="background-color:#FFE6BD"| Greg Spitz † || 1 || +
|-
| style="background-color:#FFE6BD"| Teddy Fine † || 1 || +
|-
!rowspan=2|13
| Marcus Waters || 1 || 420
|-
| The Funky White Boy || 1 || 420
|-
!15
|Low Ki || 2 || 392
|-
!16
| Aden Chambers || 2 || 378
|-
!17
| American Dragon || 1 || 364
|-
!18
| Ace Darling || 3 ||style="background-color:#bbeeff"| ¤361-379
|-
!rowspan=2|19
| Damian Dragon || 3 || 336
|-
| Matt Saigon || 3 || 336
|-
!rowspan=2|21
| Brian Johnson || 2 || 331
|-
| Justin Pusser || 2 || 331
|-
!rowspan=2|23
| Joél Maximo || 1 || 295
|-
| José Maximo || 1 || 295
|-
!rowspan=2|25
| Jay D. Luscious || 2 || 292
|-
| Mr. Ooh La La || 2 || 292
|-
!rowspan=2|27
| Bodysnatcher || 2 || 287
|-
| Black Ice || 2 || 287
|-
!rowspan=3|29
| AJ Pan || 1 || 280
|-
| Azrieal || 1 || 280
|-
| Romeo Roselli || 1 || 280
|-
!rowspan=2|32
| Chuck Payne || 3 || 265
|-
| Kyle Payne || 3 || 265
|-
!rowspan=2|34
| Dan Eckos || 1 || 259
|-
| Sean Royal || 1 || 259
|-
!36
| Mark Schraeder || 2 || 216
|-
!rowspan=2|37
| Boogie Woogie Brown || 2 || style="background-color:#bbeeff"| ¤212-243
|-
| Inferno Brown || 2 || style="background-color:#bbeeff"| ¤212-243
|-
!39
| Andrew Ryker || 1 || 203
|-
!rowspan=2|40
| Chris Rockwell/Armageddon || 3 || 196
|-
| Sam Shields/Anarchy || 3 || 196
|-
!42
| Matt Striker || 1 || 195
|-
!rowspan=2|43
| Cha Cha Chance || 1 || 189
|-
| Mega || 1 || 189
|-
!rowspan=2|45
| Armageddon || 1 ||style="background-color:#bbeeff"| ¤178-208
|-
| Viper || 1 ||style="background-color:#bbeeff"| ¤178-208
|-
!47
| Kekoa the Flyin' Hawaiian || 1 || 175
|-
!rowspan=2|48
| Bruce Maxwell || 1 || 167
|-
| TJ Cannon || 1 || 167
|-
!rowspan=2|50
| JJ the Crew Guy || 1 || 161
|-
| Mike Reed || 1 || 161
|-
!rowspan=2|52
| Kage || 1 || 154
|-
| Sean Carr || 1 || 154
|-
!54
| Devon Storm || 1 || 140
|-
!rowspan=3|55
| Julian Starr || 1 || 112
|-
| Ryan Rush || 1 || 112
|-
| Thunder || 1 || 112
|-
!58
| Steve Corino || 1 || 106
|-
!59
| Christian York || 1 || 104
|-
!rowspan=2|60
| Eric Martin || 1 || 84
|-
| Tyler Stone || 1 || 84
|-
!rowspan=2|62
| Johnny Maxx || 1 || 63
|-
| Joey Maxx || 1 || 63
|-
!rowspan=2|64
| Frankie Prichard || 1 || 56
|-
|Tahir James || 1 || 56
|-
!rowspan=2|66
| Breaker Morant || 1 || 55
|-
| Mosher Ahtu || 1 || 55
|-
!rowspan=4|68
| Kermon the German || 1 || 49
|-
| Max Von Bauer || 1 || 49
|-
| Mike Verna || 1 || 49
|-
| Talon || 1 || 49
|-
!rowspan=3|72
| Alex Arion || 1 || 28
|-
| Frankie Arion || 1 || 28
|-
| Xavier || 1 || 28
|-
!rowspan=2|75
| Asylum || 1 || <1
|-
| Matt Burns || 1 || <1
|-
!77
| Kid Flash || 1 ||style="background-color:#bbeeff"| ¤26-44
|-
!rowspan=6|78
| Charlie Haas || 1 ||style="background-color:#bbeeff"| ¤N/A
|-
| Johnny Kashmere || 1 ||style="background-color:#bbeeff"| ¤N/A
|-
| Russ Haas || 1 ||style="background-color:#bbeeff"| ¤N/A
|-
| Russian Invader I || 1 ||style="background-color:#bbeeff"| ¤N/A
|-
| Russian Invader II || 1 ||style="background-color:#bbeeff"| ¤N/A
|-
|Trent Acid || 1 ||style="background-color:#bbeeff"| ¤N/A

References

Duncan, Royal and Gary Will. Wrestling Title Histories, Revised 4th Edition. Waterloo, Ontario: Archeus Communications, 2000.

External links
 ECWA Unified Tag Team Championship

East Coast Wrestling Association championships
Tag team wrestling championships
Regional professional wrestling championships